A list of films produced in Italy in 1966 (see 1966 in film):



References

Citations

External links
Italian films of 1966 at the Internet Movie Database

Lists of 1966 films by country or language
1966
Films